Oasis (German: Oase) is a 1955 French-West German adventure film directed by Yves Allégret and starring Michèle Morgan, Cornell Borchers, Carl Raddatz and Pierre Brasseur. It was based on the 1933 novel The Commander by John Knittel. The screenplay was written by Joseph Kessel, Ben Barzman, and Georges Kessel.  It was shot at the Bavaria Studios in Munich and on location in Marseille as well as in Marrakesh, Casablanca, Agadir and Guelmim in French Morocco.

Synopsis
It tells the story of two female smugglers and an inexperienced gold smuggler.

Principal cast
Michèle Morgan as Francoise Lignières
Cornell Borchers as Karin Salstroem
Pierre Brasseur as Antoine Vallin (In the French version)
Carl Raddatz as Antoine Vallin (In the German version)
Grégoire Aslan as Pérez

External links

1955 films
1955 adventure films
Films based on Swiss novels
Films based on works by John Knittel
Films directed by Yves Allégret
Films set in deserts
Films set in Morocco
French adventure films
1950s French-language films
German adventure films
1950s German-language films
French multilingual films
West German films
German multilingual films
20th Century Fox films
1950s multilingual films
CinemaScope films
1950s French films
1950s German films
Films shot in Morocco
Films shot in Marseille
Films shot at Bavaria Studios